In audio production, a stem is a discrete or grouped collection of audio sources mixed together, usually by one person, to be dealt with downstream as one unit. A single stem may be delivered in mono, stereo, or in multiple tracks for surround sound.

The beginnings of the process can be found in the production of early non-silent films. In "Das Land ohne Frauen" (Land Without Women), the first entirely German-made feature-length dramatic talkie released in 1929, about one-quarter of the movie contained dialogue, which was strictly segregated from the special effects and music.

Mixing for films
In sound mixing for film, the preparation of stems is a common stratagem to facilitate the final mix. Dialog, music and sound effects, called "D-M-E", are brought to the final mix as separate stems. Using stem mixing, the dialog can easily be replaced by a foreign-language version, the effects can easily be adapted to different mono, stereo and surround systems, and the music can be changed to fit the desired emotional response. If the music and effects stems are sent to another production facility for foreign dialog replacement, these non-dialog stems are called "M&E". The dialog stem is used by itself when editing various scenes together to construct a trailer of the film; after this some music and effects are mixed in to form a cohesive sequence.

Live sound mixing
When mixing music for recordings and for live sound, a stem is a group of similar sound sources. When a large project uses more than one person mixing, stems can facilitate the job of the final mix engineer. Such stems may consist of all of the string instruments, a full orchestra, just background vocals, only the percussion instruments, a single drum set, or any other grouping that may ease the task of the final mix. Stems prepared in this fashion may be blended together later in time, as for a recording project or for consumer listening, or they may be mixed simultaneously, as in a live sound performance with multiple elements. For instance, when Barbra Streisand toured in 2006 and 2007, the audio production crew used three people to run three mixing consoles: one to mix strings, one to mix brass, reeds and percussion, and one under main engineer Bruce Jackson's control out in the audience, containing Streisand's microphone inputs and stems from the other two consoles.

Studio adjustments
Stems may be supplied to a musician in the recording studio so that the musician can adjust a headphone's monitor mix by varying the levels of other instruments and vocals relative to the musician's own input. Stems may also be delivered to the consumer so they can listen to a piece of music with a custom blend of the separate elements. (See List of musical works released in a stem format.)

Stems made for sale in music production
It is common in the 21st century for music producers to sell instrumental music licenses for rappers and/or singers to perform and record over. One of the most common license types is the "Premium Stem License", where a customer receives the tracked-out stem files of the instrumental. This allows the artists to have more control over the mixing of the final song.

See also
Stem mixing and mastering

References

Music production